Stirling Theological College is a former Australian Christian theological college located in Mulgrave, a south eastern suburb of Melbourne, Victoria.

History
The college was established in 1907 in Carlton, Victoria, by H. G. Harward as the College of the Bible. By 1912, there were "44 students in residence, including two women students". From 1910 to 1988 it was located in Glen Iris. It changed its name to Churches of Christ Theological College in 1989 when it moved to its current location at 44-60 Jacksons Road, Mulgrave and in September 2011 changed its name to Stirling Theological College. Stirling Theological College was named in honour of former graduate and vice-principal, Gordon R. Stirling. Stirling ministered in all Australian states and in New Zealand. After retiring he became editor of The Australian Christian. 

The college board sold the Mulgrave campus in 2020 for an estimated $25,000,000AUD.  In November 2022 the college announced that it was leaving the University of Divinity on December 31st 2022 and seeking to become a Registered Teaching Institute of Sydney College of Divinity and was also in merger discussions with the Australian College of Ministries (ACOM). The college has not gained accreditation with any higher education institution in 2023 and is closed as an accredited higher education institution, referring students to ACOM.

Notable alumni
 Ernest Aderman OBE (1894–1968) - Member of Parliament in New Zealand
 Kate Gilmore, Deputy High Commissioner for Human Rights of the United Nations
 Andrew Hughes - missionary, minister, politician, actor
 Terry Lane - noted atheist, radio broadcaster and newspaper columnist
 Gordon Moyes AC - Head of Wesley Mission in Sydney and Member of Parliament in New South Wales

Principals
Three presidents of the council of the University of Divinity and its predecessors, the Melbourne College of Divinity and MCD University of Divinity, came from Stirling Theological College: K. R. Bowes (1978–79), W. Tabbernee (1986-1987) and M. A. Kitchen (2004-05).  A. F. Menzies served as Deputy Chancellor of the University of Divinity from 2012 to 2020.

1907 - 1910: H. G. Harward
1910 - 1938: A. R. Main
1938 - 1944: T. H. Scambler
1944 - 1973: E. L. Williams
1974 - 1980: K. R. Bowes
1981 - 1990: W. Tabbernee
1993 - 1999: G. O. Elsdon
2000 - 2009: M. A. Kitchen OAM
2010 - 2020: A. F. Menzies
2020 - 2022: G. J. Hill

References

External links
 Official website

Seminaries and theological colleges in Australia
Education in Melbourne
Educational institutions established in 1907
1907 establishments in Australia
Buildings and structures in the City of Monash